Black sesame roll is a refrigerated dim sum dessert found in Hong Kong and some overseas Chinatowns. It is sweet and the texture of it is smooth and soft.

Preparation
Preparation of the dessert begins with drying a thin layer of black sesame paste. The paste eventually forms a thin refrigerated sheet. Then, the sheets are individually rolled up into a sesame roll.

See also
 Banana roll
 Black sesame soup
 Dim sum
 List of sesame seed dishes

Chinese desserts
Dim sum
Sesame dishes

References